The Blessing Way is the first crime fiction novel in the Joe Leaphorn / Jim Chee Navajo Tribal Police series by Tony Hillerman. First published in 1970, it introduces the character of officer Joe Leaphorn.

Two anthropology professors from New Mexico plan a summer research trip on the Navajo Reservation. Bergen McKee meets his college friend Joe Leaphorn, now a police officer, there. McKee's interest is the Navajo witches and the role they play in the culture. He learns of one on his first day of interviews, who unexpectedly visits his campsite in the night, beginning a saga of peril for him. Leaphorn has a murdered young man as his case, which intertwines with McKee's encounters with a true Navajo witch.

Plot summary
Anthropologist and professor Bergen McKee comes to the Navajo Reservation to research tales of witches and visit his college friend, Joe Leaphorn. Leaphorn is a Navajo Tribal Police lieutenant. A young man, Luis Horseman, thinking he had killed a man in a fight, drops out of sight. His victim survives, so Leaphorn spreads the word at a trading post to entice Luis to come in. At the trading post, McKee and Leaphorn see a tall Navajo man buying a new hat. He tells them his old one was stolen, but, curiously, the expensive silver concho hatband on it was not stolen. Leaphorn says aloud, "Otherwise we'll go in there and get him", which the stranger hears. The next morning, the body of Luis is found near Ganado, Arizona; he had been suffocated with sand after being killed elsewhere. Leaphorn rues his statement, feeling it led to this murder. McKee and his colleague, J. R. Canfield, begin a joint field trip in the Lukachukai Mountains, the canyons of the west slope. They expect to meet Ellen Leon in Many Ruins canyon, as she seeks her fiancé, Dr. Hall. In the meantime, McKee also begins interviewing reservation residents, hoping to learn details about the Navajo witch. From Horseman's aunt Old Woman Gray Rocks he learns the Navajo Wolf is believed to be an outsider from another place. 

The Tsosie family hosts a Navajo Enemy Way ceremony to deal with depredation of their livestock, which Joe Leaphorn attends. He meets Billy Nez, brother to Luis Horseman. Billy found the hat used as a symbolic scalp of the troublesome witch. The reason the witch is thought to be a stranger, Leaphorn learns, is that the Tsosie boys had found his camp, parked too far from water, and a local man would have known where the water was. Leaphorn finds the tracks of Billy and the man where Billy had taken the hat and realizes Billy will come to kill the man himself. He sets out to stop that. 

Neither Canfield nor his vehicle are at the campsite that evening. Instead, there is a note saying he will return; oddly, he signed the note John, when his name is Jeremy. McKee sleeps outside, waking on hearing unexpected sounds. He moves away from the campsite, to listen. A man wearing a wolf skin and holding an automatic weapon walks into the campsite, then into the tent to read papers there. He calls out McKee's name but McKee keeps silent and the man walks away. In the morning, McKee looks for Miss Leon so they can both drive out quickly. The man in the night left McKee's vehicle inoperable. During the night, McKee slips on the rocks, injuring his right hand painfully. They drive away, escaping the trap being set by the Navajo. McKee finds Canfield's vehicle, and sees his dead body inside it, but does not tell Miss Leon. Not fully grasping their danger, Miss Leon wants to get help for McKee. As they argue, the Navajo returns, with his weapon. He wants McKee to write a letter like the one Canfield left him. McKee's strategy is not to write the letter.

The tall Navajo sees that McKee cannot write until his hand heals. He takes the pair to an Anasazi pueblo, where his right hand is treated. Eddie, partner to the Navajo, is there, also armed. Left alone in the pueblo, Miss Leon apologizes to McKee for misunderstanding their situation.

Waking in the night, McKee finds a Hopi Kachina in the petroglyph on the wall. He begins digging for the escape exit that Hopis always had to keep from being boxed-in by their enemies. He finds it, and sets a plan in motion for the return of Eddie and George. Miss Leon exits one way, while McKee uses old hand and footholds to reach the level where Eddie is. Eddie shoots Ellen, and then seeks McKee. Eddie falls over the cliff edge into the crevasse, dying from the fall. McKee tends Ellen and seeks Hall for help. He follows electric cable to a side canyon. The Navajo shoots him in the back from a distance. McKee cuts off the insulation and uses it to make a catapult with a sapling, to throw a sharpened pine stake, right into George the Navajo, whose gun sight obscured his view. McKee picks up the Navajo's skin and gun, walking for help. Billy Nez appears with his rifle, and tells McKee to stop. McKee tells him that he is a teacher. They reach Hall at his truck, tell him about Ellen. Hall tells Billy Nez to give up his rifle, while McKee says not to do that. Leaphorn arrives at the scene, telling Billy Nez to hold onto his rifle. Leaphorn already found Ellen Leon, seeing the smoky signal fire she set.

McKee wakes in the hospital two days later, confessing his two killings to Leaphorn. Ellen Leon recovers from her wounds. Joe Leaphorn tells McKee that Hall killed himself right in front of him, after McKee fainted from loss of blood. Hall was collecting radar data about missiles under test from a federal facility, hoping to sell his information for a huge fee. George, the Navajo from Los Angeles, and Eddie worked for him, keeping people away from his work. From the federal perspective, George and Eddie did not exist; Dr. Canfield and Hall were killed in a car accident, which injured Ellen Leon and McKee. Still recovering, McKee gets a long note from Ellen Leon.

Characters
 Joe Leaphorn, Navajo Tribal Police Lieutenant, based in Window Rock, Arizona, 40 years old.
 Emma Leaphorn, wife of Joe Leaphorn and a Navajo traditionalist.
 Bergen McKee, Professor of Anthropology at the University of New Mexico and college friend of Leaphorn.
 Jeremy Canfield, fellow professor and friend of McKee.
 Sandoval, Navajo singer who leads the Enemy Way ceremony for the Tsosie and Nez families, where Leaphorn interviewed many.
 Joseph Begay – finds the body of  Luis Horseman
 Billy Nez, brother of Luis, about 16 years old, helps family in tending their sheep.
 Luis Horseman, young Navajo man, recently married, petty criminal, 23 years old.
 Old Woman Gray Rocks – aunt of Luis Horseman
 Charlie Tsosie, uncle to Billy Nez, requests the Enemy Way ceremony.
 Eddie Poher, blond haired white man and George Jackson's accomplice
 George Jackson, the tall Navajo raised in Los Angeles, long involved with mob crimes.
 Jimmie W. Hall, Ph.D., electronics expert, engaged to Ellen Leon; raised in New Mexico, educated in Philadelphia, and far too ambitious for money.
 Ellen Leon – girlfriend of Jim Hall and the daughter of a friend of Professor Canfield.
 Rudolph Bitsi – Justice of the peace-coroner in Ganado, Arizona.

Theme

The novel introduces Joe Leaphorn as a secondary character. Anthropologist Bergen McKee draws Leaphorn into the story as an old friend and colleague with whom he consults on Navajo witchcraft culture.

This story has a strong theme of the Navajo philosophy of keeping peace in life, setting priorities and living by them, against the greed for money represented by Hall and his two hired helpers. Hall is driven to make a million dollars (a lot of money in 1970) and turns to illegal means to do it, hiring one notable criminal (George) and his lesser known ally, both eager for their share if the scheme had worked.

Development of the novel
In his autobiography, Hillerman explained that McKee was the main character, and initially Leaphorn had a minor role. However, at the advice of his editors, he expanded Leaphorn's role.

Marilyn Stasio described the history behind The Blessing Way in The New York Times:

Geography
In his 2011 book Tony Hillerman's Navajoland: Hideouts, Haunts, and Havens in the Joe Leaphorn and Jim Chee Mysteries, author  has listed the following 40 geographical locations, real and fictional, mentioned in The Blessing Way. 

 Agua Sal Creek, AZ
 Albuquerque, NM
 Beautiful Valley, AZ
 Bis’ii Ah Wash, AZ
 Carrizo Mountains, AZ
 Ceniza Mesa, AZ
 Checkerboard Reservation, NM
 Chinle, AZ
 Chinle Wash, AZ
 Chuska Mountains, NM & AZ
 Farmington, NM
 Four Corners, NM, AZ, UT, & CO
 Fruitland, NM
 Gallup, NM Gallup, NM
 Ganado, AZ
 Hard Goods Canyon (fictitious location)
 Horse Fell Canyon (fictitious location)
 Kah Bihghi, AZ
 Klagetoh (Trading Post), AZ
 Los Gigantes Buttes, AZ
 Lukachukai Mountains, AZ
 Many Farms, AZ
 Many Ruins Canyon (fictitious location)
 Moenkopi, AZ
 Monument Valley, UT & AZ
 Mount Taylor, NM
 Natani Tso, NM
 Navajo Mountain, UT & AZ
 Nazlini Wash, AZ
 Round Rock, AZ
 Sabito Wash, AZ
 Seklagidsa Canyon, AZ
 Shiprock (Community), NM
 Tall Poles Butte (fictitious location)
 Teastah Wash, AZ
 Teec Nos Pos, AZ
 Toh Chin Lini Butte, AZ
 Tsay Begi, AZ
 Tuba City, AZ
 Window Rock, AZ

Reception

Kirkus Reviews wrote that "authentic anthropological details; the self-effacing courage of McKee; and a particularly exciting entrapment in the canyons of this no white man's land make this an unqualified success."

See also
 Navajo song ceremonial complex

References

Bibliography

External links
 

1970 American novels
Novels by Tony Hillerman
Novels set in New Mexico
Novels set in Arizona
Harper & Row books
1970 debut novels